Tommy Wells (13 May 1911 – 22 November 1993) was an  Australian rules footballer who played with Fitzroy in the Victorian Football League (VFL).

Notes

External links 
		

1911 births
1993 deaths
Australian rules footballers from Victoria (Australia)
Fitzroy Football Club players